VV Orionis is an eclipsing binary located in the belt region of the constellation Orion. It is a faint naked eye star.

The brightness of VV Orionis dips regularly every 18 hours. The peak visual magnitude is 5.3, which varies slowly in between the dips. The minimum brightness of the dips alternates between magnitude 5.55 and 5.66. The deep minima have a somewhat rounded bottom, while the less deep minima have flat bottoms with a constant magnitude for several hours. However, there are also additional cycles in the lightcurve that suggest that at least one of the stars is pulsating.

The VV Orionis system contains two stars which are very close but are not touching. Their orbit is aligned almost perpendicularly to us and there are both primary and secondary eclipses. During secondary eclipse, the primary transits against the secondary, which produces the flat bottom to the secondary minimum. The orbital alignment allows very precise calculation of the orbit and the properties of the stars, but results from different studies have been unusually inconsistent. The lack of a single consistent solution to the orbit has led to suggestions that there is a third star in the system, but this is unproven.

The two stars are both on the main sequence. The primary is over twice the mass, twice the radius, and thirty times the luminosity of its companion.

References

External links
VV Orionis Jim Kaler

Orion (constellation)
Algol variables
B-type main-sequence stars
Orionis, VV
036695
Durchmusterung objects
1868
026063
Beta Cephei variables